Balakot Tehsil is an administrative subdivision (tehsil) of Mansehra District in the Khyber-Pakhtunkhwa province of Pakistan.
Balakot is the main city of this area. It was one of the towns which was most damaged in the 2005 Kashmir earthquake on 8 October 2005  and an estimated 80% of the buildings there were destroyed. Villages were badly affected and landslides cut off thousands of people from Balakot where relief workers had been helping the survivors.

The major spoken language of the tehsil is Hindko.

Administration
Balakot Tehsil consists of 12 Union Councils:

Balakot
Garhi Habibullah
Garlat
Ghanool
Hangrai
Kaghan
Karnol
Kewai
Mahandri
Satbani
Shohal Mazullah
Talhata

References

Mansehra District